The 2017–18 Divizia A was the 60th season of the Romanian women's handball second league. A total of 29 teams contested the league, being divided in two series, Seria A (15 teams) and Seria B (14 teams). At the end of the season the first place from both series promoted to Liga Națională, the 2nd and 3rd places from both series played a promotion play-off together with 11th and 12th place from Liga Națională.

Team changes

To Divizia A
Relegated from Liga Națională
 —

From Divizia A
Promoted to Liga Națională
 Rapid București
 CSM Slatina

Excluded teams
 Extrem Baia Mare, Național Brașov and Sepsi SIC withdrew from Divizia A.

Enrolled teams
 CSS Tulcea, Danubius Călărași and Steaua București (Seria A)
 Corona II Brașov, KSE Târgu Secuiesc, Național Râmnicu Vâlcea, Odorheiu Secuiesc, Olimpic Târgu Mureș and SCM Timișoara (Seria B)

Renamed teams
 SCM Pitești was renamed in the summer of 2017 as Argeș Pitești.

Other teams
 Argeș Pitești was moved from Seria A to Seria B.

Teams

Seria A

Seria B

League tables

Seria A

1

Seria B

Promotion play-offs
The 11th and 12th-placed teams of the Liga Națională faced the 2nd and 3rd-placed teams of the Divizia A, from both Seria A and Seria B. The first place from each play-off group promoted to Liga Națională.

Serie I

Serie II

References

External links
 Romanian Handball Federaration 

Divizia A (women's handball)
Div
Div
2017–18 domestic handball leagues